The 65th Filmfare Awards South ceremony honoring the winners and nominees of the best of South Indian cinema in 2017 was an event that was held on 16 June 2018 at Novotel and HICC Complex in Hyderabad. The nominations for all the main awards were announced on 4 June 2018.

List of nominees

Main awards

Kannada cinema

Malayalam cinema

Tamil cinema

Telugu cinema

Technical Awards

Special awards

Multiple nominations
 Kannada – Raajakumara – 5
 Malayalam – Mayaanadhi – 7
 Tamil – Mersal – 11
 Telugu – Baahubali 2: The Conclusion  – 10

Multiple awards
 Kannada –  Chowka – 3
 Malayalam – Thondimuthalum Driksakshiyum and Mayaanadhi – 4
 Tamil – Vikram Vedha – 4
 Telugu – Baahubali 2: The Conclusion – 8

References

General
 Winners of the 65th Jio Filmfare Awards (South) 2018
 Nominations for the 65th Jio Filmfare Awards (South) 2018

Specific

Filmfare Awards South
2018 Indian film awards